Wichita Transit is the public transportation department of the City of Wichita which operates paratransit and transit bus services within Wichita, Kansas, United States.

Fleet 
Wichita Transit maintains a fleet of 51 ADA-compliant buses and 26 wheelchair-lift vans.

All regular Wichita Transit buses are equipped free wi-fi and bike racks.

Services 
Transit Services operate 17 fixed route bus lines and 17 demand-response paratransit routes. They report about two million yearly fixed-route trips and 320,800 yearly disabled paratransit trips.

Using a few replica trolleys, the city also operates the Q Line shuttle service through downtown and adjoining areas, in conjunction with the Wichita Downtown Development Corporation (chiefly during recreational days/hours, typically evenings and weekends, and during major conventions downtown).

City buses, including the imitation trolley cars, are sometimes available for charter.

History 
Wichita Transit evolved out of a long history of mass transit in Wichita. Early buses were horse-drawn. By the late 1800s and early 1900s, the city had developed a trolley rail system connecting key commercial areas to the rest of the city. By the late 1920s, the system had switched to electric trolleys.

During the 1930s/1940s, the system shifted to conventional gasoline/diesel-powered buses, and reached its peak ridership during World War II, as the city became a hub of aircraft manufacturing for the war. Routes connected nearly all of the population of the city to workplaces and commercial centers.

Following World War II and the early postwar years, in 1962, the city government took over transit—through its Metropolitan Transit Authority—to provide bus service to most of the city, chiefly through a "hub-and-spoke" system converging on downtown. The decline of downtowns, nationwide, was repeated in Wichita during the 1960s and 1970s, but the city retained its downtown hub system.

In the 1980s, and subsequently, now renamed Wichita Transit, the system generally has declined in ridership and capacity, with a brief resurgence of interest at the turn of the 21st century.

In 2016, Greyhound Lines will be closing its station and relocating to the Wichita Transit building. Greyhound Lines provides intercity bus service northeast to Topeka, Kansas and south to Oklahoma City, Oklahoma. BeeLine Express (subcontractor of Greyhound) provides daily bus service north towards Salina, Kansas and west towards Pueblo, Colorado.

Recent issues and developments 
Wichita's transit system is smaller in "revenue miles per capita" than comparable cities nationwide.

Like most transit systems, nationwide, Wichita Transit struggles continuously with financial difficulties. Rider fares do not bring in enough revenue to support the system, and it relies heavily on subsidies from the federal government and other entities.

Downtown redevelopment 
In 2010–2012, consultants for the city, advising the city on its major push for downtown redevelopment, emphasized that major transit improvements were needed for effective downtown redevelopment and growth as envisioned by city plans and proposals.

KHI health assessment 
In 2013, the non-profit Kansas Health Institute produced a "health impact assessment" ("HIA") on Wichita Transit, and its possible developments, a study and review, concluding that expanded hours and routes would have optimal impact on the health of the community's people.

Specifically, the KHI's researchers advised that a "grid" bus system (following major streets in straight lines) should replace the city's current "hub-and-spoke" system (routes radiating out from, and returning to, a downtown transit center), and advised that it should make more frequent stops, extend service after 6 p.m., and add Sunday service. They also recommended ways to maximize existing bus service. One was to allow bus passengers to carry more than two grocery sacks.

Funding and sales tax issues 
Attempts by the city council to pass a one-cent sales tax by referendum—to fund transit along with selected other city programs and projects (water, jobs, etc.) – were overwhelmingly defeated in November 2014.

The current city council considered proposing a one-tenth of one cent ($0.001) sales tax committed exclusively to transit, and in June was expected to vote on it, in August 2015, as part of the city budget process.

In mid-July 2015, the city manager presented the 2016–2017 proposed city budget, which indicated that service reductions of $2 million (or 25%) would be required to ensure a balanced budget. The City Council, however, instructed staff to find solutions to close the funding gap for 2016. Discussed solutions involved $1.2 million in deferred road construction delayed from 2016 to 2017 (with scheduled 2017 bus replacements moved up to 2016), $500,000 in fuel savings through commitment to a fuel contract, and allocation of $300,000 from the city's permanent reserve fund (the city had $26.9 million in reserves as of July 2015).

Mayor Longwell, who had campaigned on transit improvements in the 2014 election, described the effort as "painful," but important, describing transit as "that critical to our community." However, the previously discussed sales tax increase (for transit) did not figure into the budget plan, and no increase to the property tax mill levy was projected in the city budget plan discussions during July 2015. (Public hearings were pending for Aug. 4 and Aug. 11, the date that the city's 2016–2017 budget will be adopted.)

Route list 
College Hill
E. 13th Street
E. 17th Street
East Central
East Harry
E. Lincoln
Meridian
N. Broadway
North Waco
Riverside
Rock Road
S. Broadway
S. Main
S. Seneca
West Central
W. Maple
Westside Connector
Southside Connector

See also 
 Greyhound Lines
 Wichita Dwight D. Eisenhower National Airport
Historical
 Arkansas Valley Interurban Railway
 Kansas Aviation Museum

References

External links 
 
 Wichita Transit Facebook page
 Wichita Transit maps & schedules
 "Q Line" shuttle bus

Bus transportation in Kansas
Transportation in Wichita, Kansas
Transit agencies in Kansas